HBO Now (formally named HBO from July 2020) was an American subscription video on demand streaming service for premium television network HBO owned by WarnerMedia subsidiary Home Box Office, Inc. Officially unveiled on March 9 and launched on April 7, 2015 the service allows subscribers on-demand access to HBO's library of original programs, films and other content on personal computers, smartphones, tablet devices and digital media players. Unlike HBO Go, HBO's online video on demand service for existing subscribers of the linear television channel, HBO Now was available as a standalone service and does not require a television subscription to use, targeting cord cutters who use competing services such as Netflix and Hulu. As of February 2018, HBO Now had 5 million subscribers.

HBO Now was succeeded on May 27, 2020 by HBO Max, a new DTC service that also includes content from Warner Bros. and other WarnerMedia properties. Subscribers of the linear HBO television service and HBO Now were able to migrate to HBO Max at no additional cost, although some providers did not immediately reach such agreements (Amazon did not reach an agreement until mid-November, while Roku would not reach a deal until mid-December 2020). The "HBO Now" branding was dropped at the end of July, while the service and app remained available for Roku and select TiVo users; support for the HBO streaming app was formally sunset on December 17, 2020, when Roku replaced it with HBO Max.

Development
On October 15, 2014, following a trial of a similar service in Nordic Europe, HBO announced plans to launch an online, subscription video on demand service in the United States in 2015. This new service would be geared towards cord cutters – consumers who primarily use online video services to view television programs rather than subscribe to cable or satellite television – and would not have to be purchased as part of a television subscription, therefore also making it a competitor to services such as Netflix. This contrasts with HBO's existing online video on demand service, HBO Go, which is only accessible to those who have subscribed to HBO through a television provider.

On December 9, 2014, it was reported that HBO had outsourced development of the service's infrastructure to Major League Baseball Advanced Media (MLBAM), who also developed the infrastructures used by WatchESPN and WWE Network. The network was previously working on a new platform codenamed "Maui"; however HBO, especially after major outages of HBO Go that occurred during several recent season premieres of high-profile HBO series, felt that outsourcing the service to a third-party would bring lower risk to the project. Otto Berkes stepped down as the company's Chief Technical Officer following this move.

The service was officially unveiled as HBO Now during an Apple press event on March 9, 2015. It was also announced that Apple would be the service's exclusive launch partner, with the HBO Now app being exclusive to Apple TV and iOS devices for a three-month period following the service's launch. HBO Now content can also be accessed on its website. HBO Now officially went live on April 7, 2015, to coincide with the April 12 premiere of the fifth season of Game of Thrones. Apple keeps 15% of the monthly subscription fee from users who sign up from an iOS device.

Following the end of the exclusivity period, HBO Now for Android and Amazon Kindle Fire was released on July 16, 2015. HBO Now apps for Xbox 360 and Xbox One were released on April 21, 2016. On September 15, Sony announced that HBO Now will be available on the PlayStation 3 and PlayStation 4, which was later released on September 29, 2016 in anticipation for the series premiere of Westworld on October 2, and that anyone that subscribed to HBO on PlayStation Vue would be able to access HBO Now at no extra cost.

On May 27, 2020, WarnerMedia launched HBO Max, a successor to HBO Now that additionally incorporates a broad array of content from other WarnerMedia properties and third-party content providers. HBO Now subscribers that are billed directly by HBO were migrated to HBO Max on-launch at no additional cost. HBO Now will not be immediately discontinued, with WarnerMedia noting that some streaming devices may not be immediately supported on the revamped service, and renegotiations would be required with  third-party resellers such as Apple, Roku and Hulu.

Apple and Hulu would reach agreements to migrate their HBO Now customers to HBO Max. On June 12, 2020, HBO announced that the HBO Now app on remaining platforms not yet supported by HBO Max (including Amazon Fire OS, Roku and select legacy TiVo devices) would be rebranded as "HBO” on August 1. Support for TiVo devices was discontinued on August 31 from the same year, albeit without a replacement as the DVR manufacturer had not reached a deal to supersede it with HBO Max. The HBO app was relegated thereafter to a default HBO streaming platform for remaining major streaming marketplaces Amazon and Roku, which delayed replacement for several months due to disagreements over contractual distribution terms. Amazon Fire OS and Fire TV devices replaced it with HBO Max on November 16, 2020. Roku continued to offer the HBO app thereafter; however, on December 16, Roku reached an agreement with WarnerMedia to offer HBO Max on its TV sets and set-top devices effective the following day. As a result, the HBO Now/HBO streaming app was discontinued on December 17, with subscribers of the app through Roku being converted to HBO Max and Roku remotes manufactured between 2015 and 2020 with a HBO Now shortcut button now automatically redirecting users to the HBO Max app.

Content
HBO Now offered on-demand access to most of HBO's library of original series, but did not have the rights to several pre-Internet era series such as Tales from the Crypt, Tenacious D, 1st & Ten, Da Ali G Show, or The Ricky Gervais Show, where rights reverted to their original studios. The Larry Sanders Show and Arliss were initially unavailable but added in 2016 and 2018 respectively. It also streamed HBO's original films and documentaries, along with acquired films from its library through the cable channel's content partners (such as 20th Century Fox (Studios since 2020), Universal Pictures and HBO sister company Warner Bros. Pictures). WarnerMedia stated that at least 2,000 titles would be available upon the service's launch.

Like with HBO Go and HBO On Demand, HBO Now strictly served as a video on demand service and had no access to near-real-time streams of HBO's linear channels – unlike similar (in particular, TV Everywhere) streaming services offered by other television networks. HBO Now never featured programming streams or content from sister premium service Cinemax, whose programming is also available through selected vMVPD services including Hulu + Live TV, Prime Video Channels, and the Apple TV app.

Availability
HBO Now is only available to customers in the United States and certain territories of the same country. Due to regional rights restrictions, HBO cannot offer the service outside of the country, and its terms of use explicitly forbid the service from being used outside the United States. Users from outside the U.S. that are detected to have used services such as virtual private networks (VPN) to evade the geo-blocking to use HBO Now are subject to have their services terminated with no refund.

In many other countries, HBO has licensed exclusive rights to its programming to television networks owned by third parties, including Bell Media's Crave (formerly The Movie Network, and including an HBO-branded multiplex channel) and Super Écran in Canada, and Sky Atlantic in the United Kingdom. In these cases, HBO has left it up to individual rightsholders to decide whether to offer its programming on an over-the-top basis. In Canada, the Crave OTT streaming service launched a version with current HBO programming in November 2018, well after the launch of HBO Now.

On April 1, 2015, as part of an agreement with Time Warner that renewed its carriage contract for the Turner Broadcasting System networks and gave its over-the-top television service Sling TV distribution rights to the linear HBO channel, Dish Network secured an option to become a distribution partner for HBO Now following the exclusivity period with Apple. HBO content is also available as a premium add-on for Amazon Video, DirecTV Now, Hulu, PlayStation Vue for the same $14.99 price as HBO Now.

The over-the-top service was launched in Latin America in June 2017, although under the name HBO Go.

Reception
Analysts predicted HBO Now had over one million paying subscribers on iOS platforms in July 2015. In February 2016, Time Warner disclosed that HBO Now had over 800,000 paying subscribers, by February 2017 it had two million. A year later, in February 2018, it had grown to five million.

References

External links
 

Now
Home Box Office, Inc.
Internet television channels
Defunct subscription services
Defunct video on demand services
Subscription video on demand services
Internet properties established in 2015
Internet properties disestablished in 2020